Bousquet is a surname, and may refer to;

 Adolphe Bousquet (1899–1972), French rugby union player
 Don Bousquet (1948–), American cartoonist
 Francis Bousquet (1890–1942), French composer and music teacher
 Frédérick Bousquet (1981–), French swimmer
 Gaston du Bousquet (1839–1910), French engineer for Chemin de Fer du Nord
 Georges-Henri Bousquet (1900–1978), French jurist, economist and Islamologist
 Jacques Bousquet (1883–1939), French actor and writer
 Joë Bousquet (1897–1950), French poet
 Julian Bousquet (1991–), French rugby league player
 Marie-Louise Bousquet (1887/8-1975), French fashion journalist; wife of the playwright Jacques Bousquet (1883-1939)
 Raymond Henry Bousquet (1905-1935), birth name of Canadian boxer Del Fontaine 
 René Bousquet (1909–1993), French civil servant, who served as secretary general to the Vichy regime police
 Rufus Bousquet, Saint Lucian politician
 Shirley Bousquet (born 1976), French actress

See also
 Le Bousquet, Aude, France
 Bousquet Ski Area, Pittsfield, Massachusetts

French-language surnames